BinTube is a binary Usenet client for the Microsoft Windows operating system.

Features
BinTube streams video, audio and images directly from Usenet. Other features include SSL connections, automatic repair of downloaded data and OpenSearch search giving it the capability to find content on most web based Usenet search engines.

See also
List of Usenet newsreaders
Comparison of Usenet newsreaders

Notes

External links

Usenet clients
Shareware